Calleagris jamesoni, Jameson's flat or Jameson's skipper, is a butterfly in the family Hesperiidae. It is found in Angola, the Democratic Republic of the Congo, Tanzania, Zambia, Malawi, Mozambique, Zimbabwe and Botswana. Their habitat consists of Brachystegia woodland, savanna and forest margins.

Adults are on wing year round. There are fairly distinct seasonal forms.

The larvae feed on Mnondo (Julbernardia globiflora) and Machabel (Brachystegia boehmii) foliage.

Subspecies
Calleagris jamesoni jamesoni (Democratic Republic of Congo: Shaba, eastern Tanzania, Zambia, Malawi, Mozambique, eastern Zimbabwe, Botswana)
Calleagris jamesoni ansorgei Evans, 1951 (Angola)
Calleagris jamesoni jacksoni Evans, 1951 (western and northern Tanzania)

References

Butterflies described in 1890
Tagiadini
Butterflies of Africa